Norma Ovasuru (born 10 July 1989) is a Papua New Guinean cricketer. She played for the Papua New Guinea women's national cricket team in the 2017 Women's Cricket World Cup Qualifier in February 2017.

References

External links
 

1989 births
Living people
Papua New Guinean women cricketers
People from the National Capital District (Papua New Guinea)